is a song by Japanese pop-group Momoiro Clover Z, serving as their 11th single. It was released on May 8, 2014.

Details
The single was released as a standard CD and a limited edition CD and DVD package. It was first previewed during the band's performances at their March 15 and 16, 2014, concerts at the National Olympic Stadium. At the time, only the title track, the theme song for the film Akumu-chan: The Movie, and only one of the B-sides "Dōdō Heiwa Sengen", theme song for the new The Great Shu Ra Ra Boom film, were revealed, with a third then unnamed track to be included on the standard edition only. The song was ultimately revealed to be "My Dear Fellow"; it was played at New York's Yankee Stadium for Masahiro Tanaka's warmup on April 10, 2014, and had been specially made for him when he joined the New York Yankees.

Track listing

Limited edition

Regular edition

References

2014 singles
Japanese-language songs
Momoiro Clover Z songs
King Records (Japan) singles
2014 songs